The Men's 200 metre freestyle competition at the 2017 World Championships was held on 24 and 25 July 2017.

Records
Prior to the competition, the existing world and championship records were as follows.

Results

Heats
The heats were held on 24 July at 10:18.

Semifinals
The semifinals were held on 24 July at 18:42.

Semifinal 1

Semifinal 2

Final
The final was held on 25 July at 17:32.

References

Men's 200 metre freestyle